Gabriel Guerrero Martinez (born December 11, 1993) is a Dominican former professional baseball outfielder. He played in Major League Baseball (MLB) for the Cincinnati Reds.

Career

Seattle Mariners
Guerrero signed with the Seattle Mariners as an international free agent on February 10, 2011. He made his professional debut that season for the Dominican Summer League Mariners. Guerrero returned to the DSL Mariners in 2012 and also played for the Arizona League Mariners. In 68 games, he hit .349/.393/.593 with 15 home runs. Playing for the Clinton LumberKings in 2013 he hit .271 with a 661 on-base plus slugging (OPS) and four home runs. Guerrero played the 2014 season with the High Desert Mavericks. In July he played in the All-Star Futures Game. He finished the season playing in 131 games, hitting .307 with 18 home runs.

Arizona Diamondbacks
On June 3, 2015, Guerrero was traded to the Arizona Diamondbacks in a 6 player trade with the Seattle Mariners. The Diamondbacks added him to their 40-man roster after the season. Guerrero was designated for assignment by the Diamondbacks in November 2016.

Cincinnati Reds
On November 28, 2016, Guerrero was claimed off waivers by the Cincinnati Reds organization. He was non-tendered on December 2, and signed to a minor league contract on December 4.

Guerrero was called up to the majors for the first time on September 3, 2018 and made his debut the next day.  On October 3, 2018, he was outrighted to the minors and removed from the Reds 40 man roster. He elected free agency on November 3, 2018.

Miami Marlins
On November 14, 2018, Guerrero signed a minor league deal with the Miami Marlins. He was assigned to the Triple-A New Orleans Baby Cakes to begin the 2019 season. In 105 games for New Orleans (and 9 games for the Double-A Jacksonville Jumbo Shrimp, Guerrero hit .254/.270/.401 with 11 home runs and 51 RBI. He became a free agent following the 2019 season.

Toronto Blue Jays
On January 21, 2020, Guerrero signed a minor league contract with the Toronto Blue Jays organization. Guerrero did not play in a game in 2020 due to the cancellation of the minor league season because of the COVID-19 pandemic. He became a free agent on November 2, 2020.

Kansas City Monarchs
On April 5, 2021, Guerrero signed with the Kansas City Monarchs of the American Association of Professional Baseball. He played in 96 games for the team, slashing .319/.356/.485 with 18 home runs and 86 RBI.

In 2022, Guerrero was named an All-Star after hitting .305/.361/.485 with 8 home runs and 33 RBI across 48 games. On July 15, 2022, Guerrero retired from professional baseball.

Personal life
His uncles, Vladimir Guerrero and Wilton Guerrero, played in Major League Baseball. His cousin, Vladimir Guerrero Jr., is a first baseman for the Toronto Blue Jays.

References

External links

1993 births
Living people
People from Nizao
Arizona League Mariners players
Cincinnati Reds players
Clinton LumberKings players
Dominican Republic expatriate baseball players in the United States
Dominican Summer League Mariners players
Estrellas Orientales players
High Desert Mavericks players
Jackson Generals (Southern League) players
Jacksonville Jumbo Shrimp players
Louisville Bats players
Major League Baseball outfielders
Major League Baseball players from the Dominican Republic
Mobile BayBears players
New Orleans Baby Cakes players
Pensacola Blue Wahoos players
Reno Aces players
Salt River Rafters players